The Romania women's junior national handball team is the national under-19 handball team of Romania. Controlled by the Romanian Handball Federation it represents the country in international matches.

World Championship results
1977 – 3rd place
1985 – 7th place
1991 – 5th place
1993 – 5th place
1995 – 1st place
1997 – 3rd place
1999 – 1st place
2001 – 5th place
2003 – 11th place
2008 – 10th place
2012 – 13th place
2014 – 6th place
2016 – 3rd place
2018 – 8th place
2022 – 18th place

External links

 

Handball in Romania
Women's national junior handball teams
Handball